The 2020–21 Quaid-e-Azam Trophy was a first-class domestic cricket competition that took place in Karachi, Pakistan, from 25 October 2020 to 5 January 2021. Central Punjab cricket team were the defending champions. Central Punjab started their title defence poorly, with no wins from their first five matches. Despite being bottom in the table at the half-way point of the tournament, they won four of the next five matches to finish second in the table, advancing to the final with Khyber Pakhtunkhwa.

The final finished in a tie, with Central Punjab and Khyber Pakhtunkhwa sharing the title. It was the first time the final of the Quaid-e-Azam Trophy had been tied, and the first tie in the final of a domestic first-class cricket tournament. Central Punjab's Hasan Ali was named the player of the final and the tournament. Khyber Pakhtunkhwa batsman Kamran Ghulam set a new record for runs scored during a Quaid-e-Azam Trophy season with 1,249; the previous record had stood since 1983–84.

Squads

On 21 October 2020, the Pakistan Cricket Board (PCB) confirmed the squads for the tournament. Ahead of the opening round of matches, Salman Butt withdrew from the tournament and was replaced by Ali Zaryab in Central Punjab's team.

Points table

Fixtures

Round 1

Round 2

Round 3

Round 4

Round 5

Round 6

Round 7

Round 8

Round 9

Round 10

Final

References

External links
 Series home at ESPN Cricinfo

Domestic cricket competitions in 2020–21
2020 in Pakistani cricket
2021 in Pakistani cricket
2020-21 Quaid-e-Azam Trophy
Pakistani cricket seasons from 2000–01